Baba Mahama (29 April 1997) is a Ghanaian professional footballer who plays as midfielder for Ghanaian Premier League side Legon Cities FC.

Career 
Mahama played for Techiman City in 2016 during the 2016 Ghana Premier League season. He moved to Kumasi Asante Kotoko and played for them from 2017 to 2018. The club announced that they had terminated his contract in 2018. He was part of the club's entourage that were involved in an accident in July 2017. He later signed for Berekum Chelsea in 2020, and later moved to Legon Cities in 2020 on a free transfer in the club's bid to bolster their squad ahead of the 2020–21 Ghana Premier League season. He was signed along with other players including Jonah Attuquaye , Michael Ampadu and Asamoah Gyan.

References

External links 

 

Living people
1997 births
Ghanaian footballers
Association football midfielders
Ghana Premier League players
Asante Kotoko S.C. players
Techiman City FC players